The University of Oklahoma Center for Public Management(CPM) was established in 1994 on the Norman, Oklahoma campus as part of the OU College of Continuing Education's Public and Community Services Division.

External links
OU Center for Public Management website
OU College of Continuing Education
NIDRR OU open source accessibility project
 Oklahoma Health Information Security and Privacy Collaboration (OKHISPC)
Childhood Lead Poisoning Prevention Online CME Course
Oklahoma Bridge Families - Resources for Adoptive and Foster Families
Women's Leadership Conference - For Women in Public Service
Practice and Policy Lecture Series

University of Oklahoma